Route 440 is a state highway in New Jersey, United States. It comprises two segments, a  freeway in Middlesex County linking Interstate 287 (I-287) and the New Jersey Turnpike (I-95), in Edison to the Outerbridge Crossing in Perth Amboy and a  four-lane divided highway in Hudson County running from the Bayonne Bridge in Bayonne to U.S. Route 1/9 Truck (US 1-9 Truck) in Jersey City. These two segments are connected by New York State Route 440 (NY 440), which runs across Staten Island. The freeway portion in Middlesex County is six lanes wide and interchanges with the Garden State Parkway and US 9 in Woodbridge.

What is now Route 440 was designated as two different routes in 1927: the Middlesex County portion between Route 4 (now Route 35) and the proposed Outerbridge Crossing was designated Route S4 (a spur of Route 4) while the Hudson County portion was designated as a part of Route 1. In 1953, Route 440 replaced Route S4 as well as Route 1 south of Communipaw Avenue; the number was chosen to match NY 440. A freeway was built for the route in Middlesex County between 1967 and finished in 1972. A freeway was also proposed for the route in Hudson County to fill in the gap between the Bayonne Bridge and 63rd Street; however, it was never built. In 2001, Route 440 replaced Route 169 along the Bayonne waterfront.

Route description

Middlesex County 
The Route 440 freeway begins in Edison Township at an interchange with the southern terminus of Interstate 287 and the New Jersey Turnpike (Interstate 95); from Route 440's southern terminus, the road becomes northbound Interstate 287. Within this interchange, Route 440 also has access to County Route 514. It continues to the east as a six-lane road through wooded surroundings and enters Woodbridge Township at the underpass of King Georges Post Road. Here, the route interchanges with County Route 656 (Smith Street) before intersecting the Garden State Parkway and U.S. Route 9 at a large interchange. Within this interchange, the route passes under Conrail Shared Assets Operations' (CSAO) Raritan Industrial Track line. From here, the freeway turns northeast and passes under CSAO's Perth Amboy Running Track line before it enters Perth Amboy at the point where it crosses under County Route 616 (New Brunswick Avenue). Route 440 passes near homes before coming to the next interchange for County Route 501 and Route 184. At this point, County Route 501 joins the Route 440 freeway for a concurrency, and the road comes to an interchange with Route 35 a short distance later. The road continues east-southeast, with an exit for County Route 653 (Amboy Avenue) before it passes through more residential neighborhoods. The final exit on the Middlesex County portion of Route 440 serves County Route 611 (State Street). Past this interchange, Route 440 becomes the Outerbridge Crossing, a four-lane bridge maintained by the Port Authority of New York and New Jersey (PANYNJ). It passes over NJ Transit’s North Jersey Coast Line and State Street before crossing over the Arthur Kill onto Staten Island. At the New Jersey-New York state line on the middle of the bridge, the southern segments of Route 440 and County Route 501 end and become New York State Route 440. An extension of Route 440 also intersects with Route 35 right after the Victory Bridge crossing in Perth Amboy (around Shoprite)

Hudson County 

After New York State Route 440 runs  through Staten Island, it enters New Jersey again via the Bayonne Bridge, a four-lane bridge over Kill Van Kull that is also maintained by the Port Authority of New York and New Jersey. Upon entering Bayonne in Hudson County, the road becomes the northern segment of Route 440 and County Route 501 and continues north into residential sections of the city. After widening into a divided highway maintained by the New Jersey Department of Transportation (NJDOT), County Route 501 splits from the route by heading north on Kennedy Boulevard at an interchange. Meanwhile, Route 440 turns to the east, with CSAO's Avenue A Industrial Track and NJ Transit's Hudson–Bergen Light Rail line parallel to the north,  before heading northeast and passing through industrial areas as a surface road, crossing under a CSAO railroad line. It heads north-northeast as it passes between neighborhoods and the parallel CSAO Bayonne Industrial Track and NJ Transit's Hudson–Bergen Light Rail lines to the west and port areas to the east, including the former Military Ocean Terminal.

The route crosses into Jersey City, where it comes to an interchange with the Newark Bay Extension of the New Jersey Turnpike (Interstate 78) that provides access to the Jersey City and Hoboken waterfronts and the Holland Tunnel. Following this, Route 440 reaches an interchange with Route 185. Here, the mainline becomes Route 185 and Route 440 exits onto another four-lane divided highway. From here, Route 440 continues northwest, crossing under Interstate 78 and passing over CSAO's Bayonne Industrial Track and NJ Transit's Hudson–Bergen Light Rail lines before closely paralleling the north side of Interstate 78 and the south side of CSAO's National Docks Branch line. The route interchanges with Avenue C before becoming an undivided road that reenters Bayonne and crossing over County Route 501 (Kennedy Boulevard) without an interchange. Past this intersection, Route 440 makes a sharp turn to the south and passes under the Newark Bay Bridge (Interstate 78). After making a hairpin turn back to the north, it passes under the Newark Bay Bridge another time and runs along the eastern shore of Newark Bay, crossing under CSAO's National Docks Branch line. The route interchanges with West 63rd Street before crossing back into Jersey City and passing residences to the east. It intersects County Route 602 (Danforth Avenue) as the road heads into business sectors farther to the east of Newark Bay. The road heads past industrial establishments before running through commercial areas again, passing to the east of the Hudson Mall. Route 440 ends at an intersection with U.S. Route 1/9 Truck and County Route 612 (Communipaw Avenue), where the road continues north as part of U.S. Route 1/9 Truck.

History

In the 1927 New Jersey state highway renumbering, what is now Route 440 was defined as two separate routes. The Middlesex County portion from Route 4 (now Route 35) to the present location of the Outerbridge Crossing was legislated as Route S4, a spur of Route 4. Meanwhile, the Hudson County portion of the route was legislated as a part of Route 1, a route that was to run from Bayonne to the New York border in Rockleigh. Route S4 was eventually extended west to the Garden State Parkway. This route followed Pfeiffer Boulevard and the one-way pair of Lawrence Avenue and Grove Street. Meanwhile, Route 1 only existed as a state-maintained highway north of 63rd Street in Bayonne; south of there, traffic used Hudson Boulevard to access the Bayonne Bridge. A road carrying Route 1 was proposed to be built on landfill in the Passaic River; however, it was never constructed. In the 1953 New Jersey state highway renumbering, both Route S4 between the Garden State Parkway and the Outerbridge Crossing as well as Route 1 between 63rd Street and Communipaw Avenue became Route 440 in order to match New York State Route 440.

In 1959, an additional piece of Route 440 was legislated to run from the Bayonne Bridge to 63rd Street to complete the route, running over the waters of the Newark Bay; this was never built. In the mid-1950s, a freeway alignment was proposed for Route 440 in Middlesex County. This route, to be called the Middlesex Freeway, was to connect the New Jersey Turnpike and Interstate 287 to the Outerbridge Crossing. Construction began on the freeway in 1967 and it was completed in 1974. The old alignment of Route 440 along Pfeiffer Boulevard between the Garden State Parkway and Route 35 became Route 184. A freeway was also proposed in the 1960s for Route 440 in Hudson County connecting the Bayonne Bridge to Interstate 78 and filling in the gap in the route. In 1976, Route 440 was proposed along with Route 169 in a plan to redevelop the waterfront area of Bayonne.  However, the NJDOT shelved the project a year later due to low traffic volumes and feared environmental impact to the Newark Bay. Route 169 was later constructed as a four-lane arterial completed in 1992. In 2001, Route 169 was redesignated as Route 440 in order to complete the gap in the route.

On January 8, 2008, Gov. Jon Corzine announced plans for a new 35-cent toll on the Middlesex County portion of Route 440, in addition to increases on existing toll roads, to help raise funds to reduce New Jersey's outstanding debt. However, he dropped the idea to toll Route 440 a month later after mounting opposition to the idea.
Between 2015 and 2018 the New Jersey Turnpike Authority reconstructed Exit 14A between Interstate 78 and Route 440. Construction began in 2017 to replace the overpass carrying Route 440 over the Garden State Parkway and U.S. Route 9 and it was completed in 2019.

In anticipation of a general increase of activity in Port of New York and New Jersey and new development on West Side and Hackensack Riverfront in Jersey City studies are being conducted to transform the roadway into a multi-use urban boulevard that includes possible grade separations, medians, and a new traffic circle at its northern terminus.

By Joint Resolution No. 4, approved July 3, 1997, the New Jersey Legislature designated the portion of Route 440 in the city of Perth Amboy as the Edward J. Patten Memorial Highway. Democrat Edward J. Patten, a former Mayor of Perth Amboy, New Jersey, later served as Secretary of State of New Jersey and represented New Jersey's 15th congressional district in the United States House of Representatives.

Major intersections

See also

References

External links

An enlarged view of road jurisdiction at the confluence of I-95, I-287 and NJ 440 near Edison
An enlarged view of road jurisdiction at the confluence of US 9 and NJ 440 near Woodbridge Township
NJ 440 Freeway on nycroads.com
New Jersey Roads: Route 440
New Jersey Highway Ends: Route 440

440
Transportation in Middlesex County, New Jersey
Transportation in Hudson County, New Jersey
Limited-access roads in New Jersey
Freeways in the United States
Transportation in Jersey City, New Jersey